is a railway station in Aoba-ku, Sendai in Miyagi Prefecture, Japan, operated by East Japan Railway Company (JR East).

Lines

Station layout
The station has one side platform serving a single bi-directional track. The station is staffed.

History
Tōshōgū Station opened on 18 November 1988.

Passenger statistics
In fiscal 2018, the station was used by an average of 3,446 passengers daily (boarding passengers only).

Surrounding area
 Tohoku Pharmaceutical University
Sendai Nake Post Office
Sendai Tōshōgū

References

External links

 

Stations of East Japan Railway Company
Railway stations in Sendai
Senzan Line
Railway stations in Japan opened in 1988